This list contains the founding dates of North Dakota incorporated cities.

1850
Pembina

1870
Grand Forks

1871
Fargo
Wahpeton
Walhalla

1872
Bismarck
Jamestown

1874
Valley City

1875
Mapleton

1876
Casselton

1877
Cavalier

1878
Buffalo
Drayton

1879
Mandan
Sanborn
Tower City

1880
Amenia
Dawson
Fort Ransom
Kindred
Lisbon
Steele
Walcott

1881
Ardoch
Argusville
Arthur
Bathgate
Buxton
Colfax
Dwight
Gardner
Grafton
Grandin
Harwood
Hillsboro
Hope
Hunter
Larimore
Manvel
Mayville
Minto
Oriska
Reynolds
St. Thomas
Thompson

1882
Canton
Cleveland
Cooperstown
Crystal
Davenport
Devils Lake
Dickinson
Ellendale
Galesburg
Gladstone
Hamilton
Horace
LaMoure
Leonard
Neche
Page
Pingree
Pisek
Portland
Sheldon
Stanton
Tappen
Taylor
Washburn

1883
Ayr
Belfield
Burlington
Carrington
Clifford
Dazey
Elliott
Forman
Glen Ullin
Hannaford
Lakota
Medora
Michigan
Milnor
New Rockford
New Salem
Niagara
Richardton
Sheyenne
Sykeston

1884
Abercrombie
Cando
Christine
Crary
Dunseith
Fairmount
Hatton
Inkster
Minnewaukan
Mooreton
Mountain
Northwood
Park River
Petersburg

1885
Conway
Dickey
Emerado
Hebron
Langdon
Montpelier
Napoleon

1886
Churchs Ferry
Edgeley
Hankinson
Lidgerwood
Ludden
Minot
Monango
Oakes
Oberon
Rugby
Towner
Verona

1887
Ashley
Barton
Berlin
Bottineau
Buchanan
Cayuga
Edingburg
Forest River
Gilby
Havana
Knox
Leeds
Milton
New England
Osnabrock
Rutland
Williston
York

1888
Bisbee
Des Lacs
Fullerton
Great Bend
Rolla
St. John
White Earth

1889
Brinsmade
Willow City

1890
Berwick
Cogswell
Hoople

1891
Enderlin
Fingal

1892
Kensal
Kulm
Leal
Omemee
Wimbledon

1893
Cathay
Courtenay
Fessenden
Harvey
Mantador
Maza
Portal

1895
Donnybrook

1896
Aneta
Finley
Sharon

1897
Hannah
Kenmare
Perth
Rogers
Velva
Wales

1898
Anamoose
Bowbells
Carpio
Lehr
Martin
Sawyer
Wishek

1899
Balfour
Barney
Binford
Bowdon
Braddock
Linton
McHenry
Medina
Wilton
Wyndmere

1900
Alice
Berthold
Flaxton
Granville
Kathryn
Litchville
Surrey

1901
Brocket
Edmore
Esmond
Goodrich
Gwinner
Maddock
Marion
Mohall
Nome
Souris
Venturia
Voltaire

1902
Beach
Drake
Hague
Hazelton
Lawton
Omemee (disincorported c. 1990)
Palermo
Ray
Ross
Sentinel Butte
Stanley
Starkweather
Strasburg
Tioga
Wheelock
Zeeland

1903
Center
Deering
Flasher
Fort Yates
Glenburn
Hampden
Hurdsfield
Lansford
Spring Brook
Underwood
Westhope

1904
Gackle
Landa
Mott
Munich
Sherwood

1905
Adams
Alexander
Alsen
Antler
Bantry
Bergen
Calio
Calvin
Coleharbor
Egeland
Epping
Fairdale
Forbes
Fordville
Fredonia
Gardena
Garrison
Grano
Hansboro
Jud
Kramer
Lankin
Loma
Maxbass
McClusky
Mercer
Merricourt
Mylo
Nekoma
Newburg
Overly
Rocklake
Rolette
Russell (disincorporated 1996)
Sarles
Streeter
Tolley
Turtle Lake
Upham
Wolford

1906
Almont
Ambrose
Benedict
Butte
Columbus
Crosby
Douglas
Danzig ( disincorporated 2000)
Max
McVille
Pekin
Plaza
Ruso
Ryder
Tolna

1907
Bowman
Gascoyne
Haynes
Hettinger
Larson
Lignite
Loraine
Marmarth
Noonan
Reeder
Scranton
Warwick

1908
Bucyrus
Kief
Rhame
South Heart

1909
Powers Lake

1910
Carson
Elgin
Grace City
Leith
New Leipzig
Pettibone
Regent
Solen
Wildrose

1911
Amidon
Makoti
Pillsbury
Regan
Robinson
Tuttle
Wing
Woodworth

1912
Balta
Glenfield
Hamberg
Karlsruhe
Luverne
Selfridge

1913
Arnegard
Beulah
Fortuna
Golden Valley
Hazen
Rawson
Zap

1914
Dunn Center
Halliday
Killdeer
Parshall
Watford City

1915
Dodge
Golva

1916
Alamo
Grenora
Hanks
Wabek

1918
Riverside

1926
West Fargo

1946
Pick City
Riverdale

1953
New Town

1959
Sibley

1973
Briarwood
North River
Reile's Acres

1975
Prairie Rose

1976
Frontier

1977
Lincoln

1988
Oxbow

History of North Dakota

North Dakota geography-related lists
North Dakota